Agonum variolatum is a species of beetle from family Carabidae that is endemic to the US state of California.

References

Beetles described in 1851
variolatum
Endemic fauna of California
Beetles of North America
Fauna without expected TNC conservation status